Nick or Nicholas Bowen may refer to:

People
Nicholas "Nick" Bowen, president of the Chartered Institute of Linguists
Nick Bowen, CEO of Macmahon Holdings
Nicholas Bowen, educator
Nicholas Bowen, in the Peninsula Campaign Union Order of Battle

Fictional characters
Nick Bowen, character in Best Friends Getting Sorted
Nick Bowen, character played by Stephen Graham (actor) in Where The Heart Is